William Cruden (1726–1807) was a Scottish merchant who twice served as Lord Provost of Aberdeen.

Life

He was born in the parish of Strichen in northern Aberdeenshire the son of a William Cruden (b.1703) a farmer, and his wife, Anna Phaans (1700-1780). His brothers included David Cruden of Nigg, and George Cruden, who went to Aberdeen with William as a merchant.

Around 1745 he moved to Aberdeen and gained a reputation as a cloth merchant. He became a city burgess and was appointed Chief Magistrate of Aberdeen. He was first elected Lord Provost of Aberdeen in 1784 in place of William Young, serving the standard two years in this role. In 1789 he was elected for the second time, serving until 1791.

He died on 23 December 1807 and is buried in the churchyard of the Kirk of St Nicholas in central Aberdeen.

Family
He was first married to Katherine Murdoch (1718-1758) with whom he had four sons and two daughters. He next married Elizabeth Farquharson (1730-1790).

References
 

1726 births
1807 deaths
People from Aberdeenshire
Lord Provosts of Aberdeen